The Tangkhul–Maring languages are a small family of Sino-Tibetan languages spoken in eastern Manipur of northeast India and Southwestern Sagaing in Myanmar. Conventionally classified as "Naga", they are not clearly related to other Naga languages, and are conservatively classified as an independent branch of Sino-Tibetan, pending further research.

Languages
Tangkhulic languages include:
Tangkhul
Somra
Akyaung Ari
Kachai
Huishu
Tusom

The Maringic languages are:
Khoibu language
Maring language

References

 George van Driem (2001) Languages of the Himalayas: An Ethnolinguistic Handbook of the Greater Himalayan Region. Brill.